Christian Ackermann was a sculptor and carver who worked in Estonia.

Life and work

Christian Ackermann was born in Königsberg. He worked in Riga, Stockholm, and Gdańsk, before becoming active in Tallinn from about 1672 until his death in 1710. In 1675, Ackermann moved to Tallinn and worked first in the workshop of Elert Thiele, a local woodcarver. After Thiele's death in 1674, Achermann married the master's widow. He then became a citizen of Tallinn but didn't join the local guild of woodcarvers.  And that was a reason why between him and the guild's masters had begun a strong struggle which finished in court. Ackermann won and got the permission to work alone, he was the first independent sculptor in Estonia and acquired his own workshop at Toompea Hill. He probably died either in 1710 or a short time later from plague.

Christian Ackermann was one of the greatest masters of the Baroque style in Estonia. He brought strong Central European influences to Northeast Europe, in particular the motifs of the Baroque and masterful Acanthus ornaments. The majority of his works consists of almost twenty altarpieces, pulpits and large coat-of-arms epitaphs.

Most important works
 Baptistery for the Swedish St. Michael's Church in Tallinn (around 1680)

 Altarpiece for the church of Simuna (1684)
 Altar and pulpit for the church of Türi (1693)
 Pulpit with figures of the apostles (1686) and altarpiece (1696) for St Mary's Cathedral of Tallinn
 Emblem for St Mary's Cathedral of Tallinn
 Clock for the Church of the Holy Ghost in Tallinn
 Altar figures and altarpiece for the church of Martna
 Pulpit for the church of Juuru Parish (1695)
 Pulpit for the church of Karuse (1697)
 Crucifix for the church of Koeru Parish (end of the 17th century)

See also
 List of Baltic German artists

References
 Kreem, Tiina-Mall: "Der Revaler Bildhauer Christian Ackermann." In: Homburger Gespräch 1999 - 2001 issue 18, pp. 25–42

External links
  Lexicon of Baltic Artists, Riga 1908
  short biography
 (In English) Interview with Prof. Hilkka Hiiop and Dr. Tiina-Mall Kreem – curators and researchers of the project

Notes

Estonian Baroque sculptors
1710 deaths
Year of birth unknown
17th-century Estonian people
18th-century Estonian people
Artists from Königsberg
18th-century deaths from plague (disease)